Revenue Administration is a public institution of Turkish Republic operating under Ministry of Finance. The Revenue Administration is responsible for levying and collecting state taxes and respecting the taxpayer rights within the framework of Constitutional Law and tax legislation.

History 
The first fiscal organization in Ottoman Empire was established in the time of Sultan Murat I (1359-1389). This organization had been developed as a result of the rise in revenues and expenditures of the empire during the period of Mehmet II (Conqueror) and Süleyman I (Magnificent) However, there was not exactly a ministry of finance in Ottoman Empire until 1838.
The Ministry of Finance was officially established in 1838. The ministry consisted of “Departments” (Daire) under the leaderships of “Chiefs”(Reis). In broader sense today’s Revenue Administration’s duties in general were carried out by these departments. In 1881 The Ministry of Finance was divided into two as Central Administration and affiliated administrations.
In constitutional monarchy era (in 1908) the mission and organization of the Ministry of Finance substantially changed. The ministry was composed of eight directorates including general directorate of revenue administration according to the proposal of Monsieur Loran, Financial Consultant in that era. In the First Turkish National Grand Assembly the law firstly accepted was a tax law. Despite the fact that the Ministry of Finance was organized in 1923 after Turkish Republic was founded, “The Code on the Ministry of Finance and Its Duties” was accepted in 1936. 
The General Directorate of Revenues was established with the Law in 1946.
In 2005 the General Directorate of Revenue has been abolished and the Presidency of Revenue Administration has been established as public institution of the Ministry of Finance.

Administrative Structure 
Revenue Administration is organized as a headquarter and directly connected local units at the provincial level, with 448 tax offices and around 40.000 employees.

Central Organization 
The organization of the headquarters consists of main services, consulting and facilitation units.

Main Service Units 
 Department of Revenue Management  
 Department of Taxpayer Services 
 Department of Implementation and Data Management 
 Department of Collection and Disputed Cases 
 Department of Audit and Compliance Management   
 Department of EU and Foreign Affairs

Consulting Units
 Department of Strategy Development 
 Department of Legal Consultancy
 Department of Consultancy on Media and Public Relations

Facilitation Services
 Department of Human Resources 
 Department of Support Services

Tax Communication Center 

Tax Communication Center (444 0 189-VİMER), which is a call center affiliated to Revenue Administration, has receiving all calls from Turkey since March 1, 2008.
Tax Communication Center provides consulting services about tax-related issues, denunciation management and motor vehicle tax issues. Also, Tax Communication Center provides consulting services to foreigners via e-Mail Service in English.

Local Organization 
According to the 5345 numbered Law on the Organization and Duties of Revenue Administration, local administration consists 30 Tax Office Directorates in 29 cities and 52 provincial offices.

Tax Office directorates  are consist of group directorates, sub-directorates, sub-units, tax offices and commissions. The cities where the tax office directorates are as follows: Adana, Ankara, Antalya, Aydın, Balıkesir, Bursa, Denizli, Diyarbakır, Edirne, Erzurum, Eskişehir, Gaziantep, Hatay, İstanbul, İzmir, Kahramanmaraş, Kayseri, Konya, Kocaeli, Malatya, Manisa, Mersin, Muğla, Samsun, Sakarya, Şanlıurfa, Tekirdağ, Trabzon ve Zonguldak.

Duties 
Revenue Administration has the following duties:

 Implementing  revenue policy with justice and impartiality
 Collecting taxes and other revenues with the least cost; 
 Ensuring tax compliance of taxpayers; 
 To take necessary measures in order to protect taxpayers rights 
 To  inform taxpayers on their rights and responsibilities 
 To participate to the preparation of law and decree on state revenue policies
 To provide collection of public revenues and to take necessary measures on that issue
 Collecting the data on taxation, and managing the Information Technologies. 
 To take necessary precautions for preventing tax loss and tax evasion.
 To follow the international developments and to cooperate with the EU and other international organizations and foreign countries, on the issues that are in the scope of the duties.

Commissioners 
 Osman ARIOĞLU (17.05.2005 – 16.11.2007)
 Mehmet Akif ULUSOY (16.11.2007 – 16.03.2009)
 Mehmet KILCI (16.03.2009 – 05.05.2014)
 Adnan ERTÜRK (05.05.2014 -   ………… )

Tax Statistics 
Tax statistics of OECD countries, budget revenues and statistical data on taxpayer declarations can be found on yearly basis at official website of Revenue Administration under “Tax Statistics” title.

External links 
 Turkish Revenue Administration

References 

Government agencies established in 2005
Revenue services
Taxation in Turkey
Government of Turkey
2005 establishments in Turkey